Man About Town is a British style magazine for men, established in 2007. It is based in London and published in a bi-annual print edition, aimed at affluent 30 to 45-year-old "alpha males".

Man About Town's founder and editorial director is Huw Gwyther and it is owned by his holding company, Visual Talent. The magazine was established with financial backing from  British entrepreneur and businessman Peter Jones.

References

External links

2007 establishments in the United Kingdom
Magazines established in 2007
Men's magazines published in the United Kingdom
Men's fashion magazines